Edgar Brooks (1914 – 1986) was an English professional rugby league footballer who played in the 1930s, 1940s and 1950s.

Background
Edgar Brooks was born in Oldham, Lancashire, England, and he died aged 71–72 in Oldham, Greater Manchester, England.

International honours
Edgar Brooks won caps for England while at Oldham in 1939 against France, in 1940 against Wales, and in 1941 against Wales.

References

External links
Statistics at orl-heritagetrust.org.uk

1914 births
1986 deaths
England national rugby league team players
English rugby league players
Oldham R.L.F.C. players
Rugby league players from Oldham
Rugby league second-rows